Mal Anderson defeated Ashley Cooper 10–8, 7–5, 6–4 in the final to win the men's singles tennis title at the 1957 U.S. National Championships.

Seeds
The seeded players are listed below. Mal Anderson is the champion; others show the round in which they were eliminated.

 Ashley Cooper (finalist)
 Dick Savitt (fourth round)
 Sven Davidson (semifinals)
 Vic Seixas (quarterfinals)
 Neale Fraser (third round)
 Ham Richardson (second round)
 J.E. Patty (quarterfinals)
 Herbie Flam (semifinals)

Draw

Key
 Q = Qualifier
 WC = Wild card
 LL = Lucky loser
 r = Retired

Finals

Earlier rounds

Section 1

Section 2

Section 3

Section 4

Section 5

Section 6

Section 7

Section 8

References

External links
 1957 U.S. National Championships on ITFtennis.com, the source for this draw
 Association of Tennis Professionals (ATP) – 1957 U.S. Championships Men's Singles draw

Men's Singles
U.S. National Championships (tennis) by year – Men's singles